The 2023 Cape Town ePrix was a Formula E electric car race was held at the Cape Town Street Circuit in the city of Cape Town in Western Cape, South Africa on 25 February 2023. It served as the fifth round of the 2022–23 Formula E season and it was the first Formula E race held in Sub-Saharan Africa.

Background
Pascal Wehrlein entered the fifth round of the season as the points leader in the Drivers' Championship by 18 points after Jake Dennis, who was only 6 points behind going into Hyderabad did not finish after having his rear wing clipped by René Rast. TAG Heuer Porsche leads the Teams' Championship by 23 points over Avalanche Andretti.

Impact
It was estimated by a city councillor that around  would be brought to Cape Town from the event and those travelling to the city for the event. This event also was held at the same time as the African Green Economy Summit.

Classification
(All times in SAST)

Qualifying
Qualifying took place at 11:40AM on 25 February.

Qualifying duels

Overall classification

Race
The race began at 16:03 on 25 February.

Notes:
  – Pole position.
  – Fastest lap.
  – Started from the pit lane.

References

|- style="text-align:center"
|width="35%"|Previous race:2023 Hyderabad ePrix
|width="30%"|FIA Formula E World Championship2022–23 season
|width="35%"|Next race:2023 São Paulo ePrix
|- style="text-align:center"
|width="35%"|Previous race:N/A
|width="30%"|Cape Town ePrix
|width="35%"|Next race:Unknown
|- style="text-align:center"

2023
2022–23 Formula E season
2023 in South African sport
February 2023 sports events in South Africa